Zürcher is a Swiss or German surname. It is a habitational name for someone from the city of Zürich. Notable people with the surname include:

Josephina Theresia Zürcher, (1866–1932) Swiss surgeon and doctor
Brigitte Zürcher, Swiss orienteer
Christoph Zürcher, German professor
Erik Zürcher (1928–2008), Dutch sinologist
Erik-Jan Zürcher (born 1953), Dutch Turkologist
Manuela Zürcher (born 1982), Swiss footballer
Markus Zürcher (1946–2013), Swiss painter
Robert Zürcher, Swiss canoeist

German-language surnames